The Australia national soccer team has represented Australia at the AFC Asian Cup on four occasions in 2007, 2011, 2015 (where Australia both hosted the tournament and won the title)  and 2019. Australia has qualified for the 2023 tournament to be held in Qatar.

Record at the AFC Asian Cup

Record by opponent

2007 AFC Asian Cup

Group stage 

Knockout stage

Quarter-final

2011 AFC Asian Cup

Group stage 

Knockout stage

Quarter-final

Semi-final

Final

2015 AFC Asian Cup

Group stage

Knockout stage

Quarter-final

Semi-final

Final

2019 AFC Asian Cup

Group stage 

Knockout stage

Round of 16

Quarter-final

Goalscorers

References

 
Countries at the AFC Asian Cup